Yayah Jalloh (born February 20, 1981 in Koidu Town, Sierra Leone) is a Sierra Leonean international footballer is a midfielder and  currently playing for East End Lions and for the Sierra Leone national football team.

External links

1981 births
Living people
Sierra Leonean footballers
Association football midfielders
People from Koidu
East End Lions F.C. players
Sierra Leone international footballers